Domingo Silvio Benítez Alfonso (born 3 November 1935 in Tacumbú, Paraguay) is a former football goalkeeper, basketball player and coach.

Career
He started his career at Presidente Hayes from his hometown, Tacumbú. Afterwards he moved to C.A. River Plate of Asunción. In 1965 he went to Chile to play for Ferrobadminton where he won the Primera B league. After two years in América de Cali he returned to Paraguay to play in Sportivo Luqueño and end his career.

Benítez also played basketball for Presidente Hayes for a few years.

As a coach, he managed the following football teams: Presidente Hayes (1972 and 1973), Sportivo San Lorenzo, Club 12 de Octubre and 12 de Junio (Liga Chaqueña).

Titles

As a player

As a coach

References

1935 births
Living people
Sportspeople from Asunción
Paraguay international footballers
Paraguayan footballers
Sportivo Luqueño players
América de Cali footballers
Categoría Primera A players
Expatriate footballers in Chile
Expatriate footballers in Colombia
Paraguayan expatriate footballers
Paraguayan football managers
Paraguayan men's basketball players
Club Presidente Hayes footballers
Association football goalkeepers